Dobroszów may refer to the following places in Poland:
Dobroszów in Gmina Chojnów, Legnica County in Lower Silesian Voivodeship (SW Poland)
Dobroszów in Gmina Przeworno, Strzelin County in Lower Silesian Voivodeship (SW Poland)